Bridgetown is an unincorporated community and census-designated place (CDP) in Desoto County, Mississippi, United States. As of the 2010 census, it had a population of 1,742.

Demographics

References

Census-designated places in DeSoto County, Mississippi
Census-designated places in Mississippi
Memphis metropolitan area